Mouseion (formerly Échos du Monde Classique or Classical Views prior to 2001), is a peer-reviewed academic journal of the Classical Association of Canada publishing research in the field of classical studies, including archaeological studies, philology, pedagogy, history, and philosophy. It is published three times a year by the University of Toronto Press in English and French, with occasional Greek and Latin translations.

Abstracting and indexing
The journal is abstracted and indexed in:
Art Source
Emerging Sources Citation Index
IBZ Online
International Bibliography of the Social Sciences
L'Année philologique
Modern Language Association Database
Project MUSE

References

External links
 
 A Brief History of Mouseion

Classics journals
University of Toronto Press academic journals
Triannual journals
Publications established in 1956